Pere Jacques Marquette is a public art work by American artist Tom Queoff, located in downtown Milwaukee, Wisconsin. The bronze figure depicts the Jesuit missionary standing with cross in hand. It is located in Pere Marquette Park near the Milwaukee County Historical Society and Riverwalk.

References

1987 establishments in Wisconsin
1987 sculptures
Bronze sculptures in Wisconsin
Jacques Marquette
Monuments and memorials in Wisconsin
Outdoor sculptures in Milwaukee
Sculptures of men in Wisconsin
Statues in Wisconsin